Tumudibandha is a small town in Kandhamal district, Odisha, India.

References

Cities and towns in Kandhamal district